The black-bellied sunbird (Cinnyris nectarinioides) is a species of bird in the family Nectariniidae.
It is found in Ethiopia, Kenya, Somalia, and Tanzania. At an average weight of around 5 grams, this is the smallest known species of sunbird.

References

black-bellied sunbird
Birds of East Africa
black-bellied sunbird
black-bellied sunbird
Taxonomy articles created by Polbot